The Regina Cougars are the athletic teams that represent the University of Regina in Regina, Saskatchewan, Canada. The Cougars compete in all sports except football; the university's football team is known as the Regina Rams.

A number of the Regina Cougars women's ice hockey team players were featured in the filming of the Canadian comedy television series, Road Hockey Rumble.

Awards and honours

Athletes of the Year

Canada West Hall of Fame
Cymone Bouchard, Basketball: Canada West Hall of Fame - 2019 Inductee

References

External links
 

 
U Sports teams
Sport in Regina, Saskatchewan
University of Regina